WPFL (105.1 FM, "Legends 105.1") is a classic country music formatted radio station in the Pensacola, Florida, market owned by Tri-County Broadcasting, Inc. The station is licensed to serve the community of Century, Florida.

References

PFL
Radio stations established in 1988
1988 establishments in Florida